Strigocossus mediopallens is a moth in the family Cossidae. It was described by David Stephen Fletcher in 1968. It is found in Ethiopia and Uganda.

References

Zeuzerinae